Solomon Bregman (in Russian, Соломон Брегман) (1895, Zlynka – 1953) was a prominent member of the Jewish Anti-Fascist Committee formed in the Soviet Union in  April 1942. The committee was led by the famous Yiddish actor Solomon Mikhoels. 

Bregman was born in the town of Zlynka in the Chernigov Governorate of the Russian Empire (present-day Bryansk Oblast of Russia). Bregman had been a deputy minister of State Control and an active party member since 1912, when he was also appointed a Deputy Commissar of Foreign Affairs.  He was editor-in-chief of The Book About Jews-Heroes of the War against Fascism. He also participated in collecting materials for Black Book, a publication detailing the extermination of the Jews of the Soviet Union by the Germans and their collaborators during World War II. He joined JAC in 1944 when he was also recruited as an informant of the secret service MGB.

He was arrested together with other members of the Jewish Anti-Fascist Committee in 1948.  Having never admitted his guilt, "I had no involvement in the Crimea question and could not have had any involvement at presidium sessions," he declared to the trial judge.

He died in jail of heart disease on January 23, 1953.  After surviving severe beatings he had fallen into a deep coma on 16 June, in which state he remained when the death sentence was passed on all of his comrades.  Among their number only Lina Stern was spared.

Notes and References

Further reading

External links
https://web.archive.org/web/20050217214758/http://forum.grani.ru/jews/articles/eak/ In Russian.
http://www.lechaim.ru/ARHIV/124/a.htm In Russian, contains photos of the arrested members of JAC and the accusations against them.
http://process.orcom.ru/idelo2354.htm
https://web.archive.org/web/20040314025617/http://www.idf.ru/9/doc.shtml

1895 births
1953 deaths
People from Bryansk Oblast
People from Chernigov Governorate
Russian Jews
Political repression in the Soviet Union
Russian people who died in prison custody
Prisoners who died in Soviet detention
Jewish socialists
Jewish anti-fascists